Forestry, Wildlife and Fisheries is a department of Government of Punjab, Pakistan. The department itself has three separate departments.

Department of Fisheries 
The Department of Fisheries is an attached department of Forestry, Wildlife & Fisheries Department established in 1912. The department is responsible for conservation, management and development of aquatic resources in public and private sectors. 

The department is governed by the Punjab Fisheries Ordinance, 1961.

Department of Forest 
The Department of Forest is an attached department of Forestry, Wildlife & Fisheries Department created in 1886 under British rule as imperial forest service. The Department is responsible to develop, maintain, conserve & maximize forestry sector resources in the province of Punjab.

Forest department is governed under Forest Act, 1927 Amended 2010.

Wildlife Department 
Punjab Wildlife & Parks Department was established as Game Department in 1934. The department is responsible for management, preservation, conservation of wildlife diversity, habitats and sustainable development.

The department is governed under Punjab wildlife Protection, Preservation, Conservation & Management Act, 1974.

See also 
 Ministry of National Food Security & Research 
 Forestry in Pakistan
 Fishing in Pakistan
 Wildlife of Pakistan

External links
 Department of Fisheries
 Forrest Department
 Wildlife Department

References

Departments of Government of Punjab, Pakistan
Forestry in Pakistan
Fishing in Pakistan
Biota of Pakistan
Punjab Pakistan
Punjab Pakistan